Reinhold Steingräber (9 January 1957 – 3 February 2006) was a German wrestler. He competed in the men's freestyle 74 kg at the 1980 Summer Olympics.

References

1957 births
2006 deaths
German male sport wrestlers
Olympic wrestlers of East Germany
Wrestlers at the 1980 Summer Olympics
People from Bezirk Rostock